Terry Neill (born about 1945) is a former chairman of Andersen Worldwide (now Accenture).
 
Between 1970 and 2001, Neill worked at Arthur Andersen and its successors Andersen Worldwide and Accenture in Dublin, London and Chicago.

Neill was a non-executive director of CRH plc and Bank of Ireland Group from 2004. In September 2009, he became  a member of the board of United Business Media (UBM) plc.
 
Neill and his wife Marjorie met as undergraduates at Trinity College Dublin, where he obtained his MA. He received his MBA (then an MSc (Econ)) from London Business School in 1970. He is a long-standing member of Trinity Foundation Board. He is also a governor of London Business School, where he is chairman of the finance committee.

Neill was chairman of Co-operation Ireland (GB) from 1993 to 2001, and chairman of Camerata Ireland from 2004 to 2012. In 2014, he became chairman of the National Development Council of Wexford Festival Opera.

References

Living people
Year of birth uncertain
Year of birth missing (living people)